Glutamate receptor, metabotropic 6, also known as GRM6 or mGluR6, is a protein which in humans is encoded by the GRM6 gene.

Function 

L-glutamate is the major excitatory neurotransmitter in the central nervous system and activates both ionotropic and metabotropic glutamate receptors. Glutamatergic neurotransmission is involved in most aspects of normal brain function and can be perturbed in many neuropathologic conditions. The metabotropic glutamate receptors are a family of G protein-coupled receptors, that have been divided into 3 groups on the basis of sequence homology, putative signal transduction mechanisms, and pharmacologic properties. Group I includes GRM1 and GRM5 and these receptors have been shown to activate phospholipase C. Group II includes GRM2 and GRM3, while Group III includes GRM4, GRM6, GRM7 and GRM8. Group II and III receptors are linked to the inhibition of the cyclic AMP cascade but differ in their agonist selectivities.

mGluR6 is specifically expressed in the retina, in a subtype of  bipolar cells that depolarize in response to light, known as ON bipolar cells. These cells form synapses with  photoreceptor cells, and detect the neurotransmitter glutamate via a GPCR signal transduction cascade. The glutamate receptor mGluR6 is located post-synaptically at the tips of the bipolar cell dendrites, and is responsible for initiating a signaling cascade that ultimately controls gating of the TRPM1 channel. In human patients, mutations in the GRM6 gene are associated with congenital stationary night blindness.

See also
 Metabotropic glutamate receptor

References

Further reading

Metabotropic glutamate receptors